Lørenskog Ishall is an indoor ice hockey arena located in Lørenskog, Norway. The capacity of the arena is 2,450 and it was opened in 1984. It is the home arena of the Lørenskog ice hockey team. A new rink was installed in 2007.

References

External links

Indoor arenas in Norway
Indoor ice hockey venues in Norway
Sports venues in Viken
1984 establishments in Norway
Sports venues completed in 1984